The  traJ-II RNA motif is a conserved RNA structure discovered in bacteria by using bioinformatics.  traJ-II RNAs appear to be in the 5' untranslated regions of protein-coding genes called traJ, which functions in the process of bacterial conjugation.  A previously identified motif known as TraJ 5' UTR is also found upstream of traJ genes functions as the target of FinP antisense RNAs, so it is possible that traJ-II RNAs play a similar role as targets of an antisense RNA.  However, some sequence features within the traJ-II RNA motif suggest that the biological RNA might be transcribed from the reverse-complement strand.  Thus is it unclear whether traJ-II function as cis-regulatory elements. traJ-II RNAs are found in a variety of Pseudomonadota.

It was later observed that traJ-II RNAs overlap a previously established oriT (Origin of transfer) plasmid sequence, thus suggesting that the traJ RNA motif might function as an oriT.

References

External links
 

Cis-regulatory RNA elements
Non-coding RNA